In 1939, the Texas Highway Department renumbered all highways that ran concurrently with U.S. Highways. Sections of state highways that were separated by a concurrency with a US Highway were renumbered, and all suffixed routes (that did not become part of other highways or other state highways) were renumbered.

Routes not in the above table; if nothing is stated no changes were made
U.S. Highway 80 Alternate (Fort Worth): dashed on inset starting in 1938; was State Highway 1C
State Highway 23: Brady to Menard deleted on July 15, 1935
State Highway 25
State Highway 29
Spur to Retrieve Prison Farm (First SH 58 Spur, redesignated SH 35 Spur April 10, 1934): deleted on July 15, 1935
State Highway 36
State Highway 36A: became 221 on August 27, 1935, but 221 was deleted on January 6, 1939
State Highway 39
State Highway 41
State Highway 46: continued from New Braunfels to Seguin until July 15, 1935 and became FM 25 in 1942 (but became part of SH 46 again in 1988!)
State Highway 51
State Highway 52
State Highway 55: Uvalde to San Diego and Rocksprings to south of Junction deleted on July 15, 1935, but Rocksprings to south of Junction restored on November 19, 1935 and Uvalde to Dilley restored on January 18, 1937
State Highway 57: became 35 on April 10, 1934
State Highway 58: became 35 on April 10, 1934
State Highway 60
State Highway 61
State Highway 62
State Highway 67
State Highway 76
State Highway 78
State Highway 79
State Highway 80
State Highway 83: became 15 on August 8, 1935 (not effective until September 1, 1935)
State Highway 85
State Highway 86
State Highway 87
State Highway 88: became 18 on May 24, 1938
State Highway 89: deleted before or during the renumbering
State Highway 90
State Highway 91
State Highway 92: went southwest from Hamlin to Longworth until July 15, 1935 (now FM 57)
State Highway 93: became 36 on July 25, 1933, but was reused for old 97 on December 20, 1937 and became part of 97 again four months later
State Highway 94
State Highway 95: Elgin to Flatonia deleted on July 15, 1935, but Elgin to Bastrop restored on June 19, 1936
State Highway 97: Hebbronville to Rio Grande City deleted on July 15, 1935, restored on December 20, 1937, replaced 241, old route became 93; changes undone four months later
State Highway 98
State Highway 99: became 10 on July 23, 1934
State Highway 100
State Highway 101
State Highway 102
State Highway 104
State Highway 105
State Highway 108
State Highway 109
State Highway 110
State Highway 113
State Highway 114
State Highway 115
State Highway 116: became 14 on April 10, 1934
State Highway 117
State Highway 118
State Highway 119
State Highway 121
State Highway 123
State Highway 126: became 222 on August 27, 1935
State Highway 127
State Highway 128: became 44 on November 24, 1936 but was reassigned to portion of 72; new 128 was renumbered 237 on December 22, 1936
State Highway 129: became 23 on July 23, 1934
State Highway 131
State Highway 132: became 146 on September 22, 1932
State Highway 133: became 105 on July 12, 1933
State Highway 134
State Highway 135
State Highway 136
State Highway 139
State Highway 140: SH 31 to Tyler Fish Hatchery, deleted on July 30, 1934
State Highway 141: section west of what is now US 281 (then SH 66) deleted on July 15, 1935
State Highway 142
State Highway 143: became 51 on July 16, 1934
State Highway 144
State Highway 145: became Spur 73 in renumbering, then FM 75 in 1943
State Highway 146
State Highway 147
State Highway 148
State Highway 150
State Highway 151
State Highway 153: deleted on January 18, 1937
State Highway 156
State Highway 157
State Highway 158
State Highway 161: became 70 on January 22, 1931 (old 70 was deleted and is now FM 610)
State Highway 162
State Highway 163
State Highway 164
State Highway 165
State Highway 166: spur to McDonald Observatory was SH 166A.
State Highway 167
State Highway 168: unconstructed portion cancelled on February 12, 1934; remainder became 97 on March 13, 1934
State Highway 169: became 89 on November 30, 1932
State Highway 170
State Highway 172
State Highway 177
State Highway 178: became 152 on June 21, 1938
State Highway 179
State Highway 180: SH 5 to Annona, deleted on January 25, 1938; restored as 5 spur on February 20, 1939; became Spur 23 in renumbering; became FM 44 in 1942
State Highway 181
State Highway 182
State Highway 184
State Highway 186
State Highway 187
State Highway 188
State Highway 189: Artesia Wells to Catarina, deleted on July 15, 1935, but became FM 133 in 1945
State Highway 190: became 29 on March 19, 1934
State Highway 192: became 27 on June 20, 1933
State Highway 193
State Highway 194
State Highway 195
State Highway 197
State Highway 198
State Highway 201: deleted on September 11, 1934 (later 222 and 252); now FM 267
State Highway 203
State Highway 204
State Highway 205
State Highway 206: pre-1939 continued east from Cross Plains on overlap with not-yet-built SH 36
State Highway 207
State Highway 208
State Highway 209: became 152 on June 21, 1938
State Highway 210: deleted on July 15, 1935
State Highway 211: deleted on January 6, 1939, restored on January 22, 1940, only to become FM 50 and Spur 197 in 1942
State Highway 212: deleted on July 15, 1935
State Highway 213
State Highway 214
State Highway 215: deleted on April 28, 1937 due to the first Farm to Market Road being nearby.
State Highway 216: became 158 on February 11, 1937
State Highway 217
State Highway 218
State Highway 219
State Highway 220
State Highway 221: through Heidenheimer, deleted on January 6, 1939
State Highway 223
State Highway 224: SH 6 to TAMU, gone on September 26, 1939
State Highway 225
State Highway 226
State Highway 227
State Highway 229: became PR 12 during the renumbering
State Highway 230
State Highway 231
State Highway 232
State Highway 234
State Highway 235
State Highway 236
State Highway 239
State Highway 240
State Highway 243
State Highway 244
State Highway 245
State Highway 246
State Highway 247
State Highway 248
State Highway 249
State Highway 253
State Highway 254
State Highway 255
State Highway 256
State Highway 258
State Highway 259
State Highway 261
State Highway 262: deleted April 19, 1938; part became SH 303 on December 1, 1938; remainder became RM 87 in 1943, now SH 176 and SH 137
State Highway 263: deleted on March 21, 1939; became FM 82 in 1943, now SH 121
State Highway 264
State Highway 265
State Highway 267
State Highway 268: deleted on August 31, 1939; became RM 380 in 1945
State Highway 269
State Highway 270
State Highway 272
State Highway 273
State Highway 274
State Highway 275
State Highway 276
State Highway 277
State Highway 278
State Highway 279
State Highway 281: Proposed for Spur 78
State Highway 287: Proposed for SH 9 north of Amarillo
State Highway 296: Proposed for SH 36 north of US 183, or after August 21, 1939, Rising Star
State Highway 298: Proposed for Spur 69
State Highway 299
State Highway 300
State Highway 301
State Highway 302
State Highway 303
State Highway 304
State Highway 305
State Highway 307
State Highway 308
State Highway 309
State Highway 310: became part of PR 10 during the renumbering
State Highway 311
State Highway 313
State Highway 314
State Highway 315
State Highway 316
State Highway 317
State Highway 318

Park Roads:
Bastrop State Park Road 1
Caddo Lake Park Road 2
Davis Mountain Park Road 3
Longhorn Cavern Park Road 4
Palo Duro Canyon Park Road 5
Big Bend National Park Road 6
Meridian Park Road 7
Big Spring Park Road 8
San Jacinto Battle Ground State Park Road 9
Lockhart State Park Road 10: extended over State Highway 310 during the renumbering
Palmetto State Park Road 11
Washington-On-The-Brazos State Park Road 12: was State Highway 229 before the renumbering
Goose Island State Park Park Road 13: designated August 31, 1939 as State Highway 319, 35A, or 35 Spur before the renumbering?

Loops and Spurs:
Uvalde Spur 1: 3 Spur
Waco Loop 2: 2 Bypass (alternate route of 2 on 1937 map)
New Braunfels Loop 3: 2 Bypass
Buda Loop 4: 2 Loop
Kyle Loop 5: 2 Loop
Kirkland Loop 6: 5 Loop
Jasper Loop 7: two routes called 8 Spur on each end that were connected during the renumbering
Beaumont Loop 8: 8 Bypass ("by-pass" on 1937 map)
Olton Spur 9: 28 Spur
Grapevine Loop 10: 114 Loop or 121 Loop
Wichita Falls Loop 11: 5 Loop
Dallas Loop 12: 40 Bypass
San Antonio Loop 13: 2 Loop
Texarkana Loop 14: 47 Bypass
Goldthwaite Loop 15: 7 Business
El Paso Loop 16: 1 Loop
Karnes City Loop 17: probably 123 Loop
Oglesby Spur 18: 7 Spur
Ringgold Loop 19 and Ringgold Spur 19: 2 Loop and 2 Tap
Laredo Loop 20: 12 Loop
Spur Spur 21: 18 Spur
Peacock Spur 22: 18 Spur
Annona Spur 23: 5 Spur
Wiergate Spur 24: 87 Spur
Langtry Spur 25: 3 Spur
Lorenzo Spur 26: 24 Spur
Sweet Home Spur 27: 72 Spur
Danbury Spur 28: 35 Spur
Forest Spur 29: 40 Spur
Frost Spur 30: probably 22 Spur
Blooming Grove Spur 31: probably 22 Spur
Barry Spur 32: probably 22 Spur
Frisco Spur 33: 24 Spur
Chireno Loop 34: probably 21 Loop
McMahan Chapel Spur 35: probably 21 Spur
Keltys Loop 36: 40 Loop
Keltys Loop 37: 5 Loop
Bogata Loop 38: 49 Business
Klondike Spur 39: 24 Spur
Santo Spur 40: 1 Spur (originally 89 Spur)
Mobeetie Spur 41: 152 Spur
Roaring Springs Loop 42: 18 Spur
Tatum Loop 43: 43 Loop
Levelland Loop 44: 24 Loop
Southland Spur 45: 7 Spur
Post Loop 46: 7 Loop
Bovina Loop 47: 33 Loop
Austin Spur 48: 71 Spur
Corsicana Spur 49: probably 22 Spur
Burleson Loop 50 and Burleson Spur 50: probably 174 Loop and 174 Spur
Yoakum Loop 51: 72 Bypass
Columbus Spur 52: 71 Spur
West Spur 53: probably 2 Spur
Thornton Spur 54: 14 Spur
Brandon Spur 55: 22 Spur
Mertens Spur 56: 22 Spur
Conroe Spur 57: probably 19 Spur
Sugar Land Spur 58: 38 Spur
West Columbia Spur 59: probably 35 Spur (originally 58 Spur if it was designated before April 10, 1934)
LaRue Loop 60: probably 40 Loop
Eustace Loop 61: probably 40 Loop
Rusk Loop 62: probably 40 Loop
Malakoff Spur 63: 31 Spur
Trinidad Spur 64: probably 31 Spur
Baxter Spur 65: 40 Spur
Kilgore Spur 66: 26 Loop
Ackerly Spur 67: 9 Spur
Buna Loop 68: 8 Loop
Deweyville Spur 69: 87 Spur (planned as SH 296)
Rockport Loop 70: probably 35 Loop
Fannin's Grave Spur 71: 29 Spur
Sinton Spur 72: 16 Spur
Princeton Spur 73: SH 145
Whiteface Spur 74: 24 Spur
Lockney Loop 75: 28 Loop and 28 Spur
O'Donnell Loop 76: 9 Loop
Tulia Loop 77: 9 Loop
McDonald Observatory Spur 78: SH 166A (planned as SH 298)
Stinnett Loop 79: old alignment of SH 152
Arp Spur 80: old alignment of SH 64

References

State highways in Texas